Naloni Mitoni is a Javanese prenatal ceremony held during the seventh month (tujuh bulan in Indonesia) of a woman's first pregnancy. The mother-to-be is wrapped in seven layers of batik and doused with water, to wish her good tidings. Food served in the occasion are:
Fruit rujak: a special fruit rujak is made for this occasion, and later served to the mother-to-be and her guests, primarily her female friends. It is widely known that the sweet, spicy and sour tastes of fruit rujak are adored by pregnant women. It consists of slices of assorted tropical fruits, such as jambu air (water apple), pineapple, raw mangos, bengkoang (jicama), cucumber, kedondong, raw red ubi jalar (sweet potato) and jeruk bali (pomelo). The sweet and spicy-hot bumbu rujak dressing is made of water, gula jawa (palm sugar), asem jawa (tamarind), ground sauteed peanuts, terasi (shrimp paste), salt, bird's eye chili, and red chili pepper. The recipe of rujak for this ceremony is similar to typical Indonesian fruit rujak, with the exceptions that the fruits are roughly shredded instead of thinly sliced, and the jeruk bali (pomelo/pink grapefruit) is an essential ingredient. It is believed that if the rujak overall tastes sweet, the unborn would be a girl, and if it is spicy, the unborn baby would be a boy.
Tumpeng: the tumpeng is made of white rice, encircled by six smaller tumpengs. The dish is served in tampah, which is made of bamboo wood and banana leaf.
Family members and friends usually gather for the occasion.

Javanese culture